Albert and Victoria is a British sitcom that aired on ITV from 1970 to 1971. Starring Alfred Marks, it was written by Reuben Ship. It was made for the ITV network by Yorkshire Television.

In Albert and Victoria, Marks plays Albert Hackett, a middle-class man in late 19th-century England. He and his wife Victoria have nine children, and he is used to getting his own way.

Cast
Albert and Victoria saw a substantial change of cast between the two series, with new actors for the characters of Victoria, Emma and Maud. The replacement of Zena Walker as Victoria by Barbara Murray was intended to last for the entire second series; however, during filming, Murray had a miscarriage. She was then replaced by Frances Bennett for the final four episodes.

Series One
Alfred Marks - Albert Hackett
Zena Walker - Victoria Hackett
John Alkin - George Hackett
Petra Markham - Lydia Hackett
Kika Markham - Emma Hackett
Helen Cotterill - Maud

Series Two
Alfred Marks - Albert Hackett
Barbara Murray - Victoria Hackett (episodes 1 and 2)
Frances Bennett - Victoria Hackett (episodes 3 to 6)
John Alkin - George Hackett
Petra Markham - Lydia Hackett
Gay Hamilton - Emma Hackett
Julia Sutton - Maud

Plot
Albert Hackett is a middle-class man in late 19th-century Britain, who is used to getting the final word over his wife Victoria and their five children.

Episodes
The first series of Albert and Victoria aired for six thirty-minute episodes on ITV from 13 June to 18 July 1970, airing on Saturday evenings at 6.45pm. On Christmas Day 1970, a short special aired as part of All-Star Comedy Carnival. A second series, also of six thirty-minute episodes, aired from 14 August to 17 September 1971 on Saturday evenings, mostly at 5.40pm. While all the episodes survived the wiping policy of the era, the 1970 Christmas short is lost and thought to have been destroyed.

Series One (1970)

Series Two (1971)

References
General

Specific

External links

1970 British television series debuts
1971 British television series endings
1970s British sitcoms
ITV sitcoms
Television series by Yorkshire Television
English-language television shows